DENPA LLC is an American publishing company located in Portland, Oregon. The company was established in 2018 and it was announced at Otakon in August of the same year by Ed Chavez, former Vertical marketing director and vice president of Fakku.

Titles
 An Invitation from a Crab by panpanya
 Baby Bear's Bakery by Kamentotsu
 Fate/Grand Order: Chaldea Scrapbook by Nakatani
 Futurelog by Range Murata
 Gambling Apocalypse: Kaiji by Nobuyuki Fukumoto
 The Girl with the Sanpaku Eyes by Shunsuke Sorato
 Guyabano Holiday by panpanya
 Heavenly Delusion by Masakazu Ishiguro
 Inside Mari by Shūzō Oshimi
 Lil' Leo by Moto Hagio
 Lockdown Zone: Level X by Romy Oishi and meshe
 March Comes In like a Lion by Chica Umino
 Maiden Railways by Asumiko Nakamura
 Miss Kusakabe by Shūzō Oshimi
 The Men Who Created Gundam by Hideki Ohwada
 Mobile Suit Gundam: Char's Counterattack - Beltorchika’s Children by Uroaki Sabishi and Takayuki Yanase
 Nana & Kaoru by Ryuta Amazume
 PEZ by Hiroyuki Asada
 Pleasure & Corruption by You Someya
 Rakuda Laughs by Katsuya Terada
 Renjoh Desperado by Ahndongshik
 Shino Can't Say Her Name by Shūzō Oshimi
 Short Game by Mitsuru Adachi
 Super Dimensional Love Gun by Shintaro Kago (previously published by Fakku)
 Tawawa on Monday by Kiseki Himura
 They Were Eleven by Moto Hagio
 Today's Menu for Emiya Family by TAa
 Under Ninja by Kengo Hanazawa
 Urotsukidōji by Toshio Maeda (previously published by Fakku)
 Vampeerz by Akili

References

External links
Official website

2018 establishments in Oregon
Book publishing companies based in Oregon
Comic book publishing companies of the United States
Manga distributors